The year 1833 in architecture involved some significant events.

Buildings and structures

Buildings

 Carlton House Terrace in London, designed by John Nash, is completed.
 Marble Arch in London, adapted by Edward Blore from a design by John Nash, is completed on its original site.
 Vermont State House in Montpelier, Vermont, United States, designed by Ammi B. Young is completed.
 Hotel Seurahuone, Helsinki, Finland, designed by Carl Ludvig Engel, is completed.
 The Grand Theatre, Warsaw, Poland, designed by Antonio Corazzi, is opened.

Awards
 Grand Prix de Rome, architecture: Victor Baltard.

Births
 January 1 – Robert Lawson, Scottish-born architect working in Australasia (died 1902)
 March – Frederick Pepys Cockerell, English architect (died 1878)
 May 23 – E. W. Godwin, English architect and designer (died 1886)
 July 15 – Christian Jank, Bavarian architect (died 1888)
 July 20 – Karl Hasenauer, Austrian architect (died 1894)
 July 31 – Édouard Deperthes, French architect (died 1898)

Deaths
 December 18 – Jean-Charles Krafft, Austrian-born French architect (born 1764)

References

Architecture
Years in architecture
19th-century architecture